The WABA Champions Cup 2010 was the 13th staging of the WABA Champions Cup, the basketball club tournament of West Asia Basketball Association. The tournament was held in Tehran, Iran. The top four teams from different countries qualify to the FIBA Asia Champions Cup 2010.

Standings

Results

External links
www.asia-basket.com

2010
International basketball competitions hosted by Iran
2009–10 in Asian basketball
2009–10 in Iranian basketball
2009–10 in Lebanese basketball
2010 in Syrian sport
2010 in Iraqi sport